Trần Thị Kim Chi is the former Spouse of the President of Vietnam during the presidency of Nguyễn Minh Triết from 2006 to 2011.

References

Year of birth missing (living people)
Place of birth missing (living people)
Living people

Spouses of Vietnamese leaders
21st-century Vietnamese women politicians